Apyrauna is a genus of beetles in the family Cerambycidae, containing the following species:

 Apyrauna annulicornis Martins, 2005
 Apyrauna maculicorne (Germain, 1898)

References

Elaphidiini